Conneaut Lake  is the largest natural lake in Pennsylvania by surface area. It is located in western Crawford County near a town with the same name. Its has a surface area of approximately 925 acres. The site of the lake is actually in adjacent Sadsbury Township and nearby Summit Township. During the summer season, it is heavily populated with people vacationing to the lake area, some from the area spending time in their houses on the lake, and many others from the surrounding area that like to spend the summer away from home, many of these people being residents of the Pittsburgh area.  Other than the lake itself, the largest draw to the area has long been a popular resort known as Conneaut Lake Park, long known for its amusement park.

Geography
Conneaut Lake was formed as a kettle lake at the end of the Pleistocene. A large block of ice broke off the receding ice front and was surrounded by accumulating sediment. After the ice melted, the resulting depression was filled with water forming the lake. Water flows into Conneaut Lake through Inlet Run, a small stream on the north end of the lake. Water exits through the Conneaut Outlet, a larger creek which flows to the south through the Conneaut Marsh. The Conneaut outlet flows into French Creek, making it part of the Mississippi River drainage.

Depth 
For the size of the lake, it has an oddly shallow depth. In most areas the lake is around 20 to 25 feet (6 to 7.6 m) deep, however in some places it is over 50 feet (15.25 m) deep. Its greatest depth is about 75 feet (22.9 m).

History
Before the early 19th century, Conneaut Lake was conspicuously absent from maps of the region, while much smaller nearby lakes were shown. The first recorded account of the lake was on May 5, 1791. A settler named Cornelius Van Horn was captured by Wyandots or their allies near what is today Meadville, Pennsylvania. He was taken on a path through the forest and bound to a tree near the lake's outlet. Van Horn managed to free himself using a small knife.

In the 1870s, canals were made obsolete by railroads, and the lake was returned to its natural elevation, though a dam remains for flood control. Before the construction of large reservoirs, Conneaut was the largest lake in Pennsylvania other than Lake Erie. The advent of rail travel made it a popular place for recreation. An amusement park, Conneaut Lake Park, was built on its western shore. The lake is notable as a site of early motorboat racing. The deep, cold waters of the lake allow it to stay frozen relatively late into the spring. This made Conneaut Lake a vital source of ice, prior to mechanical refrigeration.

During the second half of the 20th century, Conneaut Lake's prominence as a tourist destination declined. Automobile travel allowed people to travel further from the cities for their weekend leisure. Streams were dammed, forming reservoirs larger than Conneaut Lake throughout the area. However, the lake still draws many locals and its lack of power restrictions continues to draw powerboats.

According to the 2000 Census, roughly 3,000 people live around Conneaut Lake.

See also
Harveys Lake (Pennsylvania), the largest natural lake in Pennsylvania by volume
List of lakes in Pennsylvania

References

External links
Conneaut Lake Resort Area (Conneaut Lake Business Association)
Conneaut Lake Community Development Committee
Conneaut Lake Park
Conneaut Lake Institute
Conneaut Lake Borough

Lakes of Pennsylvania
Bodies of water of Crawford County, Pennsylvania